The Kaub gauging station is a stream gauge located on the Rhine river in the German city of Kaub. It is a "decisive" water level measurement site for the Rhine, as Kaub is located at the shallowest part of the Middle Rhine and ships with freight from North Sea ports have to pass Kaub on their way to the industrial southwest of Germany. The gauge level does not directly correspond to the actual depth of the river (zero level is not at the riverbed); instead, as is the case with most Rhine gauges, the actual depth of the navigation channel is defined as:
 Gauge value + Ideal depth of the navigation channel (1.9 m) − Equivalent water level (0.78 m)
For example, a gauge level of 60 cm corresponds to an actual navigation depth of 0.60 + 1.90 - 0.78 = 1.72 m.

When the level at the gauge reaches the low 75 cm mark, the reduced possible load means that four times as many container barges are required to transport the same volume of goods when compared to the high (250 cm) level. The river becomes nearly impassable for freight at a gauge level of 35 cm (there is no hard lower limit). Navigation is prohibited above the high water mark II (6.40 m).

Location 

The gauge is located at Rhine-kilometre 546.3 on the right side of the river (slightly downriver from Pfalzgrafenstein Castle), near the center of Kaub and adjacent to the Kaub ferry, signal mast and the former pilot station.

History 
In Kaub, a staff gauge was built in 1856. The gauge tower was built by Prussia and opened on May 18, 1905 with a level recorder and a display of the current water level on a large mechanical indicator (electrified in 1951). Since 1967, the gauge has been equipped with remote data transmission. A measurement announcement device was added in 1968 and a punched tape recorder was set up in 1973. When the gauge was modernised in 2011, paper recording was dropped and a second, redundant, measuring device was installed instead. The measured values are transmitted to the hydrological data center and can be checked at the  site.

Role in navigation 
The Kaub gauge is of central importance to shipping on the Rhine to destinations above Koblenz. The amount of cargo to be carried on the Rhine is limited by the draft of the ship being low enough to pass at Kaub. The load of a large (135 m) container vessel is seriously affected by low water: a full capacity load is possible at the 250 cm level, the load drops to 50% at 135 cm, to 25% at 75 cm, and to 16% at 55 cm. 

When the gauge level is below 40 cm, freight navigation is practically impossible, although specially designed vessels can get through even at 35 cm.

Information 

Information about the gauge:
 Zero level: 67.66 m above sea level (since January 1, 1951)
 High water mark I (HSW I): 4.60 m
 High water mark II (HSW II): 6.40 m (shipping prohibited)
 Highest water level (HHW): (1883) 8.25 m
 Mean water level (MW) in the time series 2000-2010: 2.24 m
 Lowest observed level (NNW) (22 October 2018): 0.24 m
 Equivalent water level (GlW): 0.78 m
 Fairway depth (TuGlW): 1.90 m. 
 Water levels for the last 14 days:

Floods

References

Sources 
 
 
Water transport in Germany
Rhine
Rhein-Lahn-Kreis